You Can Do Better is the fourth studio album by British rock band Johnny Foreigner. It was released in March 2014 under Alcopop! Records in the UK and Vinyl Junkie in Japan. Lame-O Records released the album in the United States on 19 August 2014.

Track list

References

2014 albums
Johnny Foreigner albums
Alcopop! Records albums